Cuculluna is a genus of moths of the family Noctuidae. The genus was erected by Paul Köhler in 1952. Both species are known from La Rioja Province, Argentina.

Species
Cuculluna cristagalli Köhler, 1952
Cuculluna haywardi Köhler, 1979

References

Cuculliinae